Phytoecia fervida is a species of beetle in the family Cerambycidae. It was described by Francis Polkinghorne Pascoe in 1871. It is known from South Africa.

References

Phytoecia
Beetles described in 1871